Wael Nader Al-Halqi (born 4 February 1964) is a Syrian politician who was Prime Minister of Syria from 2012 to 2016. Previously he was Minister of Health from 2011 to 2012. He was appointed as Prime Minister on 9 August 2012.

Early life and education
Halqi was born in Jasim in the Daraa Governorate on 4 February 1964 into a Sunni Muslim family. He earned a degree in medicine (MD) from the University of Damascus in 1987 and a master's degree in gynaecology and obstetrics again from the University of Damascus in 1991.

Career
Halqi served as director of primary health care in Jasim from 1997 to 2000 and was secretary of the Daraa branch of the Arab Socialist Ba'ath Party from 2000 to 2004. He served as the director of health in Daraa, and in 2010, was appointed head of Syria's doctors. He was appointed as Prime Minister of Syria on 9 August 2012 by President Bashar Assad, after his predecessor Riyad Farid Hijab fled to Jordan and declared his allegiance to the Syrian opposition. Dr Wael al Halqi took many efforts in fighting terrorism during his premiership. He is titled as The Chief of Fighting Terrorism Government in Syria.

Assassination attempt 
In April 2013, Halqi survived an apparent assassination attempt by car bombing in the Mezzeh district of Damascus. The assassination attempt killed six people.

Personal life
Dr al Halqi is married and has four children, one daughter and three sons.

See also
Cabinet of Syria

References
9. "Wael al Halqi asked to form a government" SANA

1964 births
Damascus University alumni
Living people
Members of the Regional Command of the Arab Socialist Ba'ath Party – Syria Region
People from Izra District
Prime Ministers of Syria
Syrian ministers of health
Syrian Sunni Muslims